The 2011–12 Quaid-e-Azam Trophy was one of two first-class domestic cricket competitions that were held in Pakistan during the 2011–12 season. It was the 54th edition of the Quaid-e-Azam Trophy, contested by 22 teams representing regional cricket associations and departments, and was followed in the schedule by the Pentangular Cup, contested by five teams representing the four provinces and the federal areas.

The competition format was retained from the previous season, with the teams being split into two divisions: twelve teams (six regions and six departments) in Division One and the remaining ten teams (seven regions and three departments) in Division Two. Each division was played in a round-robin of 4-day matches starting on 23 October 2010, with 5-day finals between the top two teams to determine the winners. At the end of the season, the lowest ranked department and region in division one were to have been relegated to division two, with the equivalent top teams in division two being promoted and the lowest department being relegated to Grade II cricket, but the domestic structure changed prior to the 2012–13 season.

Pakistan International Airlines won the Quaid-e-Azam Trophy for the seventh time, beating Zarai Taraqiati Bank Limited by nine wickets in the Division One final, which like the previous season was a day/night match.

Division standings
The top teams in each division (highlighted) advanced to the finals.

Finals

Division Two

Division One

Notes

References

External links
 Quaid-e-Azam Trophy 2011–12 Division I – ESPNcricinfo
 Quaid-e-Azam Trophy 2011–12 Division II – ESPNcricinfo

Domestic cricket competitions in 2011–12
2011 in Pakistani cricket
2011–12 Quaid-e-Azam Trophy
Pakistani cricket seasons from 2000–01